Arthur Bergquist (18 June 1930 – 1993) was a Swedish footballer who played as a defender.

References

Association football defenders
Swedish footballers
Allsvenskan players
Malmö FF players
1930 births
1993 deaths